Neil Ivan Weightman (born 5 October 1960) is a former English cricketer.  Weightman was a left-handed batsman who bowled right-arm off break.  He was born at Normanton-on-Trent, Nottinghamshire.

Weightman made his debut for Nottinghamshire in a List A match against Hampshire in the 1980 John Player League.  He made seven further List A appearances, the last of which came against Derbyshire in the 1981 NatWest Trophy.  In his eight List A appearances, he scored just 44 runs at an average of 5.50, with a high score of 17.  He made his first-class debut for the county against Lancashire in the 1981 County Championship.  He made two further first-class appearances in 1981, against Leicestershire and Surrey, while in 1982 he made a single appearance against Cambridge University.  In his four first-class matches, he scored a total of 175 runs at an average of 29.16, with a high score of 105.  This score was the only time he passed fifty and came against Leicestershire.

References

External links
Neil Weightman at ESPNcricinfo
Neil Weightman at CricketArchive

1960 births
Living people
People from Bassetlaw District
Cricketers from Nottinghamshire
English cricketers
Nottinghamshire cricketers